Serajul Huq (1925 - 28 October 2002) was a Bangladeshi lawyer and former member of parliament in Bangladesh.

Career 
Huq was a  founding member of the Awami Muslim League and was a close associate and confidant of Sheikh Mujibur Rahman. He was an  organiser of the Bangladesh Liberation war in 1971 and was one of the first  persons to cross over to India to seek assistance from the Indian Government  against the genocide committed by the Pakistani Army. He  was a  lawyer of the Supreme Court of Bangladesh and in 1973 was  appointed the chief prosecutor for the crimes perpetrated during the 1971 war.  Subsequently, in 1996 he was appointed the chief prosecutor in the Sheikh Mujibur Rahman murder case and in the jail killing case where four leaders of the country was  killed in the Dhaka Central Jail in 1975.

Family
Huq's was born to Nurul Huda, a police officer and Jaheda Khan, daughter of Yunus Ali Khan and sister of writer and novelist Farid Uddin Khan. His son Anisul Huq is a member of parliament and minister for law, justice and  parliamentary affairs of the government of Bangladesh.

References 

1925 births
2002 deaths
Awami League politicians
20th-century Bangladeshi lawyers
People from Kasba Upazila
Recipients of the Independence Day Award